Acaxochitlán is one of the 84 municipalities of the state of Hidalgo, in central-eastern Mexico. The municipality covers an area of 226.1 km². As of 2005, the municipality had a total population of 34,892. Acaxochitlan has three languages; Nahuatl, Spanish, and Otomi.

Etymology 
Its name derives from the Nahuatl words "acatl" meaning "cane," and "xochitl" meaning "flower", which form the word "acaxochitl," a term also used to designate a plant belonging to the reed family and its red flowers. The suffix "tlan" means "place." Thus, the name Acaxochitlán translates as "place of abundant Acaxochitl" or "place where the reed bears flowers."

History of Acaxochitlan 
This village is typical of our Mexico, is very old as human settlement, occupied by various cultural groups in Mesoamerica, was a stopping place for the ancestors who came and went between the Gulf of Mexico and the center of the republic. 
While it is likely that from time further back and has been inhabited.

It is not known when it became a settlement because there is still no complete investigation of the people, it is known that there is evidence from the time of the Toltecs, that there were people here in Acaxochitlan.

"Acaxochi" as the locals say, you know the state was Tula mid 800 AD And continued so until about 1200 d. C. for 1300 A.D. was submitted by the Otomi Jaltocan kingdom. At this time only Otomi and Totonac was spoken, but to AD 1400 Chichimeca came and introduced the use of the Nahuatl language.

Decades later Acaxochitlan shall be submitted to the realm of Tenochtitlan, but only for a short time because after the kingdom of Texcoco would take control of the place, and it is in those moments that come the Spaniards, whom he would ally to defeat Tenochtitlan.

Despite contact with Spain, there were many traditions that were not altered and that there are to this day, such as handmade embroidery, dances, and there were customs that were modified to give a mixture of cultures, such as how to build our homes, and food (gastronomy).

Now let's talk first of its archeology, and architectural constructions after their handmade textiles and last of their dances and cuisines.

In addition there were many social changes, a new system was implemented on the parcel, and put emphasis on evangelism, which affected the society as I outline the Spanish as the dominant language, and began the decline of native languages.

Languages 
Unlike other Latin American countries, where native peoples belong mostly to a single language group, whose language has been elevated to the status of co-official in the company of Spanish, in Mexico there are about 62 indigenous peoples who speak between sixty two and more than a hundred different languages (depending on the source consulted).

Unlike the United States where there are many linguistic groups, most of these groups are foreign, but a few are native. 
In the early twentieth century indigenous Mexicans were more than half of the population, their participation in the Mexican Revolution calling land and better living conditions, he was satisfied only partially, currently according to the count of 1995 the natives are only 11% of the total population.

In Acaxochitlan live Otomi Tepehuas, Nahuas and mestizos, so it is a sample of what Mexico is today. Even though barely 34 thousand inhabitants only a third retains the native tongue, the other speaks only Spanish.

Architecture 

In 1544 begins to build the first chapel visit, which belonged to the ecclesiastical head of Snapper and this in turn to the diocese of Tlaxcala, unfortunately there are a lot of history from the colonial period is not known, for example, we do not know as was the standard of living of the population, if I get worse or remained the same or improved with the arrival of Spaniards.

In 1568 the parish was founded, taking as patroness St. Mary of Assumption. In the following years would more religious works. How are the chapels of San Mateo visit (Guachevatlan) Zacacuautla, San Miguel (Quaquacala), Santa Ana (Zacuala), San Francisco (Chapantla), San Juan (Eloxochitlán), San Pedro (Amaxac) and Tepepa.

For 1575 Acaxochitlan becomes part of the jurisdiction of Tulancingo. It is subject to the authority of Tulancingo. In 1606 for the first time the charge was given to a descendant of King Moctezuma, Mr. Juan Andrada Moctezuma; 33 years later is legally granted its territory "Acaxochi, what is called" legal fund".

There is a canvas copies of drawings explaining this event, the funny thing is that it is a mixture of ancient Mesoamerican codices with many European elements.

During the eighteenth and nineteenth century that would highlight some houses in the town, one is "Los Portales" and another "The Zacanteco" in this house the illustrious citizen Luis Ponce was born is construirirían. He was born in the nineteenth century, in 1839 it was heavily influenced by his mother, the year his mother died, the health of Luis Ponce suffered serious until he died the same year, and his grave has the inscription "Luis Ponce no could live without her mother. "This character was a liberal patriot, support the government of Juarez against the French, wrote poems, founded a hospital in Tulancingo, and two newspapers.

Returning to buildings, houses one of the best preserved of the municipality is "La Casa Grande" which to date remains as originally built. Another is "La Constancia" end of the nineteenth and the home of "The Melo" were built and "The Family Sosa" porfiriano both the eclectic style. Already started building the twentieth century "La Esmeralda House."

By 1909 the chapel of Our Lady of Guadalupe, on the pre-Hispanic pyramid base was built, the chapel has a Gothic style, looks very well finished on the facade. The kiosk and fountain were made in 1910 year beginning of the Mexican revolution. It would be years until 1928 did buy the machinery for the clock to 1932 and would be placed.

A few years after the presidency of Acaxochitlan ask the General Lazaro Cardenas Mexico that road - Tuxpan passed through the town. And the first gas station was built in 1940 but even today the visitor can go to Acaxochitlan and enjoy many comforts of modernity few decades ago did not exist, electricity was introduced through the efforts of Mr. Alfredo Martínez Castelán in 1946 with money who buy land to build a house of power line and start building a power grid. 
Subsequently, a health center, a tele and the auditorium would be built. The current kiosk city was made in 1982 and subsequent remodeling the central plaza would.

Handmade fabrics 
There are cultural traits that have endured dare time, one of them is the tissue that is in the region are Nahuatl garments that still has pre-Hispanic techniques, such as loom and different types of embroidery. Some clothes that develop are: backpacks, quexquemitl, sashes, shawls and woolen blankets, embroidered blouses, skirts, belts and separators.

Most village women wear girdles from small to hold the diaper, and when they grow their skirt or petticoat, is a tradition. The fabrics are from the town, they are very beautiful and also difficult to make, years of training are required, and are linked to the pre-Hispanic past, all symbols are embroidered on them, if you look carefully you will see as a basic figure appears the diamond ... and the union of several diamonds form the figure of the cross symbolizing the four directions, north, south, east and west. 
A few years ago the figure of the goddess of corn hallo, and this pre-Hispanic figure also appears with her huipil which is embroidered with diamonds. Until I found the recent "black gentleman" typical tape that men are tied at the waist, and so has the knot again symbolizes the four directions are.

Beyond embroidery, this activity is an essential part of women's role in society, accepted by all, as an activity made by women and for the connoisseur of culture, women's clothing is a beautiful expression of our Mexico. Clear attire has variations by region of the country, there are even different types of clothing in Acaxochitlan, according to the district to which they belong, but all share a common pre-Hispanic past.

Dances 
The most striking fiestas are in May, the 3 is the feast day, which is celebrated with dances, music, dances quetzals, flying bat, and santiagos reed dance, processions and a small fair. The 15th is the traditional spring festival is also performed dances and traditions, for example regional fruits, wines, jams, ciders, and crafts are set forth.

Dance of the quetzal, has a complex and difficult movements that require great precision choreography.

The Jameses dance is closely related to the Moors and Christians. It is a war dance that Spanish missionaries introduced in Mexico to tell how the Apostle Santiago led the Spanish struggle against the Moors eight centuries.

Flying pole dance, it is in the mountainous area of the Gulf of Mexico and the Sierra de Puebla, This ceremony reached its height in ancient times as an important part of the solar cult and calendrical that took place throughout Mesoamerica. 
When it does not rain, there is a person in charge of the ceremony of the motion of rain.

The procession worships the "collateral sir," and followed by much of the population, full of color as community offerings that are designed by the eight districts that make up the municipality are used, this procession is a very important element of cohesion and solidarity the municipality, as well as serving to preserve traditions and spirituality.

Food 
Within the typical food of the region is jerky, zacahuil which is a large tamale that sometimes measures up to 2 meters, ranchero chicken, enchiladas, and ground chocolate metate. Also this delicious barbecue, typical dish of the state of Hidalgo is shown that the blend of cultures, to bring maguey leaves and lamb meat cooked in a pit dug in the ground, a technique that seems to be native to the Maya. No poisonous wild mushrooms. Just need to get to the quarters of the town to sample some tasty dishes known, for example "Roses tortillas San Francisco" is a pink delicious tortillas that are made with a special corn in that neighborhood. In conclusion we can say that Acaxochitlan has many attractions to national and foreign visitors, such as history, archeology, beautiful garments typical pre-Hispanic legacy, ancient rituals, dances rich and varied cuisine, and very beautiful sunrises as those given in Omitemetl dam.

References

 Acaxochitlan Municipal Archive, Hidalgo. Municipal Presidency.
 "Carta del licenciado Francisco Ceynos, oidor de la audiencia de México, al emperador," original date June 22, 1532; in the work Colección de documentos para la historia de México : versión actualizada by Joaquín García Icazbalceta. Published on the web in 1999 by Miguel de Cervantes Virtual Library: Alicante. (in Spanish). Accessed August 25, 2014.
 National Indigenous Institute (INI: 1998): "Indigenous languages of Mexico", on the website of the National Commission for the Development of Indigenous Peoples (CDI), accessed March 9, 2007.
 Cifuentes, Barbara (1998): History of indigenous peoples of Mexico: Multilingualism through history, INI
 https://web.archive.org/web/20080905015317/http://www.uv.mx/Popularte/esp/scriptphp.php?sid=660 dances.
	García Icazbalceta, Joaquín "Colección de documentos para la historia de México" "Carta del licenciado Francisco Ceynos, oidor de la audiencia de México, al emperador." 22 de junio de 1532texto en la web Cervantes Virtual
	Sobre el lenguaje que debe usarse en los escritos de oficio, Congreso mexicano, 31 de mayo de 1822
	Instituto Nacional Indigenista (INI: 1998): "Lenguas indígenas de México", en el sitio en Internet de la Comisión Nacional para el Desarrollo de los Pueblos Indígenas (CDI), consultado el 9 de marzo de 2007.
	Cifuentes, Bárbara (1998): Historia de los pueblos indígenas de México: Multilingüismo a través de la historia, INI
	Los lienzos de Acaxochitlan y su importancia en la historia del poblamiento de la sierra norte de puebla y zonas vecinas, de Guy Stresser Pean, 1998. ISBN
	Luis Ponce, en Lorenia Lira, Taller de Historia de Tulancingo, archivomunicipal@tulancingo.gob.mx
	Datos de tejidos, danzas y gastronomía, proporcionados por la Maestra Olga Castañeda.
	Revisión de texto y complementación de texto, Álvaro Ávila Cruz. recopilacion de datos e investigacion, historiador juan carlos martinez hdez, revision del texto karen Y. saldierna santos. en colaboracion con INAH, departamento de diffusion de la historia.
	Información de arqueología dada por el Arq. Carlos Hernández.

External links
Official municipality web site

Municipalities of Hidalgo (state)
Populated places in Hidalgo (state)
Populated places established in 1544
1544 establishments in the Spanish Empire
Nahua settlements